The following is a list of Nigerian billionaires. It is based on an annual assessment of wealth and assets compiled and published by Forbes magazine.

Lists

2022

2021

2020

2019

2018

2017

2016

2015

2014

See also
 Forbes list of billionaires
 List of countries by the number of billionaires

References

Nigeria
net worth
Billionaires